DysEnchanted is a short subject about seven storybook characters: Cinderella, Snow White, Goldilocks, Sleeping Beauty, Alice In Wonderland, Dorothy and Little Red Riding Hood.  They are in group therapy dishing and dealing with what comes after "happily ever after". When Clara, a New Jersey divorcee, joins the group she discovers that life is no fairy tale.

Written and directed by Terri Miller, DysEnchanted is only eight minutes long (six, without credits).  It was shot in Culver City, California over two ten-hours days.  It was originally supposed to be longer, but was slimmed down due to time constraints.  The film is little known, released in 2004.

Cast
Laura Kightlinger (Cinderella)
Sarah Wynter (Sleeping Beauty)
Alexis Bledel (Goldilocks)
Jaime Bergman (Alice)
K.D. Aubert (Little Red Riding Hood)
Shiva Rose McDermott (Snow White)
Amy Pietz (Clara)
Jill Small (Dorothy)
James Belushi (The Shrink/Doctor)

External links
The Dysenchanted Website

2004 fantasy films
2004 short films
2004 films
American short films
American fantasy films
2000s American films